Tine Baun (née Rasmussen; born 21 July 1979) is a Danish former badminton player. Most notably, she won the All England Open Badminton Championships women's singles title three times in 2008, 2010, and 2013 – the last of these being her final tournament before retirement.

Career
Baun started playing badminton at the age of 7. She played at Lynge, a small club in North Zealand, Denmark. She said she really liked traveling around the world and learning other cultures through sports. She made her international debut in 1996 at the Denmark Open, and since finishing her education in 1999, she started playing badminton professionally full time. 

At the 2004 Summer Olympics, Baun was eliminated by Petya Nedelcheva in round 32. At the BWF Super Series, she won the 2007 Japan Open, beating all Chinese-born players from the first match, including the 1st seed, Zhang Ning, in the quarterfinal. She also won the 2008 Singapore Super Series, beating Zhou Mi in the final.

She won the silver medal at the 2008 European Badminton Championships after losing to Huaiwen Xu in the final with a rubber set. Baun also played at the 2008 Olympics in Beijing as the 6th seed. She beat Akvile Stapusaityte in the round of 32, but was eliminated after losing to Maria Kristin Yulianti 21–18, 19–21, 14–21 in the round of 16.

Baun claimed three titles in 2009, the Malaysia Open by beating the 1st seed, Zhou Mi in the final, the Korea Open by beating Pi Hongyan, and the Denmark Open by beating the 1st seeded, Wang Yihan. She played in the 2009 All England Super Series as the first seed, reaching the final by beating two younger competitors in the quarterfinal and semi-final. She lost in the final to Wang Yihan, thus losing her title with a score of 19–21, 23–21, 11–21.

Baun won the gold medal at the 2010 European Badminton Championships after beating Juliane Schenk in the final. In the 2012 European Badminton Championships, she defended her title against the same opponent. In 2010 she won a bronze medal at the BWF World Championships held in Paris. She was defeated in the semi-finals by Wang Lin with a score of 11–21, 8–21.

At the 2012 Summer Olympics, she reached the quarter finals, losing to Saina Nehwal of India 2–0. After progressing no further than the quarter finals in the Super Series tournaments of 2012 and 2013, she ended her career high by winning the prestigious All England Open against 18-year-old Ratchanok Intanon of Thailand. It was her third All England title and fourth time reaching the final in that tournament.

After retiring, she joined the Europe All Stars Team to participate in the 2013 Axiata Cup. In the preliminary round, she was defeated by Intanon from Thailand in three sets, scoring 21–9, 13–21, 12–21. In August 2013, Baun played at the Indian Badminton League for the Mumbai Masters team, earning a reported salary of $30,000.

Personal life
Rasmussen married Martin Baun, her physiotherapist, in May 2010.

Achievements

BWF World Championships
Women's singles

European Championships
Women's singles

European Junior Championships
Girls' singles

BWF Superseries
The BWF Superseries, which was launched on 14 December 2006 and implemented in 2007, was a series of elite badminton tournaments, sanctioned by the Badminton World Federation (BWF). BWF Superseries levels were Superseries and Superseries Premier. A season of Superseries consisted of twelve tournaments around the world that had been introduced since 2011. Successful players were invited to the Superseries Finals, which were held at the end of each year.

Women's singles

  Superseries tournament
  Superseries Premier tournament

IBF International
Women's singles

Record against selected opponents
Record against year-end Finals finalists, World Championships semi-finalists, and Olympic quarter-finalists.

Career overview

References

External links
 

1979 births
Living people
People from Hørsholm Municipality
Danish female badminton players
Badminton players at the 2004 Summer Olympics
Badminton players at the 2008 Summer Olympics
Badminton players at the 2012 Summer Olympics
Olympic badminton players of Denmark
World No. 1 badminton players
Sportspeople from the Capital Region of Denmark
21st-century Danish women